Beveled rim bowls are small, undecorated, mass-produced clay bowls most common in the 4th millennium B.C. They constitute roughly three quarters of all ceramics found in Uruk culture sites, are therefore a unique and reliable indicator of the presence of the Uruk culture in ancient Mesopotamia.

Physical characteristics
Beveled rim bowls are generally uniform in size standing roughly 10 cm tall with the mouth of the bowl being approximately 18 cm in diameter. The sides of the bowls have a straight steep angle down to a very defined base usually 9 cm in diameter. The bowls are made of low fired clay and have relatively thick walls compared to other forms of pottery of the time—making them surprisingly robust. The most unusual aspects of beveled rim bowls are that they are undecorated and found discarded in large quantities.

Production
While the exact method for production of beveled rim bowls is unknown, the most widely accepted theory is the use of a mold. A lesser accepted theory is that the bowls were made by hand. Archeologists replicating beveled rim bowls have found it considerably difficult to achieve the straight sides and well defined base while only using their hands. The use of a mold has been found to be a significant advantage when replicating the bowls. The large numbers of beveled rim bowls found (often in a single site) seem to support the mold theory because mass production with a mold is far more feasible than making them by hand. A debate exists among advocates of the mold theory. Most impose the use of a mobile mold that could be made of a variety of materials including wood, metal, stone or even another beveled rim bowl. Others suggest that craftsmen would have used a ground mold wherein the bowls were formed in a conical depression created in the ground.

Use
Beveled rim bowls are widely thought to be used for measurement of barley and oil as rations. The rations would be given as payment to laborers for services rendered. This idea is supported by the resemblance of the beveled rim bowls to the cuneiform sign for ration (NINDA). It is also supported by the fact that the bowls are often found whole and in large piles as if they were disposable. The bowls would have been used for rationing once or twice and then discarded in a central location. An alternate theory is that the bowls were used for baking bread, which also could have been rationed in its container.

Distribution
Beveled rim bowls originated in the city state of Uruk in the mid-fourth millennium B.C. As the Uruk culture expanded so did the production and use of these bowls. According to Marc Van De Mieroop, “Examples have been excavated in the Zagros mountains (e.g., Godin Tepe, Choga Gavaneh), in northern (e.g., Tepe, Ozbeki, Tepe Sialk), central (e.g., Tepe Yahiya), and southern Iran (e.g., Nurabad).  They were even found on the modern coast of Pakistan near the Gulf of Oman (Miri Qalat)", which belonged to Kechi-Makran culture.

Historical significance
Roughly 75% of all ceramics found with Uruk culture sites are bevel-rimmed bowls, so two major aspects make them historically significant to archeologists. First, they are one of the earliest signs of mass production of a single product in history. Second, their suspected use as a form of payment to workers is a milestone in history because there is no evidence of rationed payments before beveled rim bowls.

References

 Van De Mieroop, M. (2008). A history of the ancient Near East. Malden, MA: Blackwell Publishing.
 Millard, A.R. (1988). The Bevelled-Rim Bowls: Their Purpose and Significance. British Institute for the Study of Iraq.
 http://chnm.gmu.edu/worldhistorysources/d/250/whm.html
 
 http://findarticles.com/p/articles/mi_hb3284/is_324_84/ai_n56365600/?tag=content;col1
 http://ucfant3145f09-08.wikispaces.com/Megans+Sections

Further reading 
 

4th-millennium BC works
Ancient pottery
Ancient Mesopotamia
Archaeological artifacts
Uruk period